Strap It On is the debut album by American alternative metal band Helmet. It was first released in 1990 through Amphetamine Reptile Records, and later Interscope Records in 1991.

Critics considered the album innovative for its explosive, propulsive, and often staccato riff style which greatly exploited Drop D tuning.  It has since become a cult classic in the post-hardcore genre and even influential on the metal scene.

Background and recording
Helmet was formed in 1989 by vocalist/guitarist Page Hamilton after he left the alternative rock group Band of Susans. Hamilton would recruit guitarist Peter Mengede, bassist Henry Bogdan, and drummer John Stanier. Having not settled on a name yet, Mengede's then-wife Reyne Cuccuro suggested the Germanic name of "helmuth". Having misinterpreted her, Hamilton thought she was referring to the helmet protective gear. Thinking it was "a pretty cool name for a band", Hamilton went with the Anglicized spelling and the band was named Helmet.

The band was quickly noticed by Halo of Flies guitarist Tom Hazelmyer, who signed Helmet to his label Amphetamine Reptile Records; the band would release its debut 7" single, "Born Annoying", later in 1989.

In total, $2,500 dollars were spent on making the album. The album was produced by Wharton Tiers and the band.

Release
Strap It Ons original release came through independent noise rock label Amphetamine Reptile Records in March 1990. In November 1991, it was re-released by their new label Interscope Records, approximately one month before the band started recording Meantime for the label. Some sites such as AllMusic list its year of release as being 1991, as does the 2004 compilation album Unsung: The Best of Helmet 1991–1997 (although in the booklet of the compilation itself the year is 1990).

Reception and legacy

The album received positive reviews, with critics praising the band's fresh, raw and innovative sound. In November 1992, the original Amphetamine Reptile release was estimated to have sold 10,000 copies; this figure does not take into account the 1991 Interscope reissue. Amphetamine Reptile Records founder Tom Hazelmyer would later state that Strap It On kept the label going throughout the 1990s.

AllMusic's Jason Birchmeier wrote in his review "The nine-song album is a brief one, clocking in around a half-hour, but even such brevity proves wonderfully exhausting by the time you near the last couple songs. In fact, by the time you make it past 'Sinatra', one of the album's highlights and also the halfway point, slow fatigue threatens as the riffs continue to hammer away unrelentingly and vocalist Page Hamilton's sometimes-tuneful, oftentimes-bellowing shouting grows seemingly further agonized. The overall relentlessness should be a sheer pleasure to those who enjoy the intensity of metal without the clownish clichés yet, at the same time, enjoy the originality of alt-rock without the pansy passivity."  In 1994, The New York Times labelled Strap It On as "relentlessly noisy." In 2006, Pitchfork labelled it and Meantime as one of "the metal band's two triumphs."
Future guitarist Chris Traynor was a fan of the album, and considered it to be "one of the most important rock records ever."

Kerrang! ranked the album at No. 19 in their list of "The 50 Best Albums From 1990", and stated that the album is "balanced on the centre-point between alt.metal, noise rock and post-hardcore." Stereogum named the track "Sinatra" as one of the "30 Essential Noise Rock Tracks", and described most of the album as groove metal.

In 2004, the songs "Repetition", "FBLA", "Blacktop" and "Sinatra" appeared on the compilation album Unsung: The Best of Helmet 1991–1997. The track listing for the compilation was chosen by Page Hamilton. The Sacramento-based alternative metal group Deftones covered the song "Sinatra," with it appearing on their 2005 compilation album B-Sides & Rarities. The song was also covered by the band Livver on the 2016 Helmet tribute album Meantime (Redux). The album further included covers of "Bad Mood" by Blackwolfgoat and "Blacktop" by Heads.

Track listing
All music and lyrics by Page Hamilton.

Accolades

PersonnelBand Page Hamilton – vocals, guitar
 Henry Bogdan – bass
 Peter Mengede – guitar
 John Stanier – drumsTechnical'
 Wharton Tiers – mixing, engineering, production

References

1990 debut albums
Helmet (band) albums
Amphetamine Reptile Records albums
Interscope Records albums